The Church of the Holy Spirit is a Roman Catholic church in the Black Sea city of Batumi, Georgia’s autonomous republic of Adjara. It was constructed in the late 1990s by the Georgian architects Oleg Pataridze and Giorgi Baghoshvili and consecrated in 2000.

The building replaced the earlier church which was confiscated by communists during the Soviet occupation but since 1989 serves as the Georgian Orthodox Cathedral of the Mother of God.

References

Roman Catholic churches completed in 2000
Batumi
Churches in Batumi
20th-century Roman Catholic church buildings
Tourist attractions in Adjara